Isotrias penedana is a species of moth of the family Tortricidae. It is found in the Serra da Peneda in north-western Portugal.

The wingspan is 16–20 mm. The ground colour of the forewings is whitish-creamy with yellowish-brown or amber spots. The hindwings are pale greenish and greenish distally. Adults have been recorded on wing in mid-June.

Etymology
The species is named for the Serra da Peneda.

References

Moths described in 2013
Polyorthini